Events from the year 1916 in Sweden

Incumbents
 Monarch – Gustaf V
 Prime Minister - Hjalmar Hammarskjöld

Events

 1 March - Inauguration of the Liljevalchs konsthall.

Births

 10 January – Sune Bergström, biochemist  (died 2004)

Deaths

 5 March - Cilluf Olsson, textile artist (born 1847)

References

 
Years of the 20th century in Sweden
Sweden